Jodłów may refer to the following places in Poland:
Jodłów, Lower Silesian Voivodeship (south-west Poland)
Jodłów, Lubusz Voivodeship (west Poland)
Jodłów, Opole Voivodeship (south-west Poland)